The Global Alliance for Banking on Values (GABV) is an independent association of 'values-based banks' with a shared mission to use finance to deliver environmental, social, and corporate governance (ESG) positive outcomes.  The GABV consists of over 60 member banks, credit unions and microfinance institutions, from a total of 44 countries. The group has 16 supporting partners. Its headquarters are in Amsterdam, Netherlands.

Marcos Eguiguren from GABV said that values-based banking means putting "People before Profit"  These are banks that use money to deliver economic, social and environmental development. They set themselves apart from traditional banks based on where they put their customers' money, how they manage lending, such as by providing loans and services to sustainable projects, individuals, and entrepreneurs, and avoiding investing money in the pure financial and speculative economy, by support their local communities and the environment, and by how they treat their staff and customers.

History 
The GABV was founded in 2009. Its founding members were Triodos Bank, ShoreBank, BRAC Bank, Mibanco Peru, Alternative Bank Switzerland, Merkur Bank, GLS Bank, Banca Etica Adriatica, New Resource Bank and XacBank.   In 2010, the company had its first annual meeting in Bangladesh.

The 2011 Lima Declaration demanded that value-based banks be recognized through appropriate regulation and not be adversely impacted by regulations intended to address issues related to mainstream banks.

2013 resulted in the first International Banking on Values Day, the creation of the Europe and North America regional chapters, as well as the Berlin Declaration.

In 2014, the GABV's scorecard, a set of common impact metrics, which allows banks to report their social impact of a bank through a harmonised method, was launched.  

The ninth summit was held in Kathmandu, Nepal in 2017. This meeting concluded with the Kathmandu Declaration, a commitment to a long-term positive social impact towards renewing the whole banking system.

In November 2022, BRAC Bank hosted the group's 13th in-person summit, in Dhaka, Bangladesh.

Notable members 

 Alternative Bank Switzerland
 Amalgamated Bank
 Bank Australia
 Bank Muamalat
 Beneficial State Bank
 BRAC Bank Limited
 Centenary Bank
 Cultura Sparebank
 Ecology Building Society
 ESAF Small Finance Bank
 GLS Bank
 Kindred Credit Union
 Lift Above Poverty Organization
 MagNet Bank
 National Cooperative Bank
 SDB bank
 Southern Bancorp
 Triodos Bank
 Unity Trust Bank
 Vancity
 Vdk bank
 Verity Credit Union

See also 
 Small finance bank

References

External links 

 Official Website